The Franciscan Missionaries of the Eternal Word (MFVA, Latin for Missionarii Franciscani Verbi Aeterni) is a Public Clerical Association of the Faithful, located in the Roman Catholic Diocese of Birmingham in Alabama. They were founded in 1987 by Mother Angelica, who also founded the Eternal Word Television Network (EWTN) and the Shrine of the Most Blessed Sacrament in Hanceville, Alabama.

The primary residence of the Friars is in Irondale, Alabama, and is next door to EWTN. They also have a residence in Hanceville, AL, near the Shrine of the Most Blessed Sacrament.

The Friars' apostolate is to communicate the Catholic faith by word and example.  It involves using the media: television, radio and the Internet, as well as publishing and conducting retreats. Currently, they focus their attention on the television and radio ministry, in addition to providing for the spiritual needs of the Poor Clares of Perpetual Adoration, the EWTN employees, and the visitors who come to EWTN and the Shrine.

In contrast to Franciscan communities that focus on the corporal works of mercy, the Franciscan Missionaries of the Eternal Word devote themselves to the spiritual works of mercy.  Therefore, they study to gain a deep knowledge of the Catholic faith and practice communicating it effectively.

Adapting to the needs of the time, they have developed into an active religious institute, but still maintain elements of the contemplative life. In addition to praying the Liturgy of the Hours, the Friars devote an hour each day to Eucharistic Adoration and pray the daily Rosary.

The community is composed of priests and seminarians, as well as consecrated brothers.

Friar Communities

Priests 
Fr. Leonard Mary, Community Servant (Superior)
Fr. Patrick Mary, Community Vicar
Fr. Dominic Mary, Council Member
Fr. Mark Mary, Council Member
Fr. Anthony Mary, Council Member
Fr. Joseph Mary
Fr. Miguel Marie
Fr. John Paul Mary
Fr. Paschal Mary
Fr. Matthew Mary

Brothers 
Br. John Therese Marie, Council Member
Br. Bernard Mary
Br. Leo Mary

References

External links

Franciscan Missionaries of the Eternal Word - Website
Eternal Word Television Network

Franciscan missionary orders
Christian organizations established in 1987
Catholic religious institutes established in the 20th century
Catholic Church in the United States
Birmingham